James George Basham (12 May 1903 – 1977) was a British boxer. He competed in the men's welterweight event at the 1924 Summer Olympics.

References

External links
 

1903 births
1977 deaths
British male boxers
Olympic boxers of Great Britain
Boxers at the 1924 Summer Olympics
Welterweight boxers